The R2C was the color version of the 2nd Z80-based microcomputer produced by Regency Systems of Champaign, Illinois, the first being the RC1.  The RC1 had a high resolution display and dual 8-inch floppy disk drives.  It was essentially a standalone PLATO environment, adapting the TUTOR language and environment.  The company was founded by David Eades, a real-estate agency owner, and Paul Tenczar, creator of the TUTOR language.

The R2C supported an Ethernet network and a hard drive.  The introduction of the IBM AT, with 16-bit processor, hard drive, and EGA display, sparked a change in direction for the company away from hardware.

References

Early microcomputers
Companies based in Champaign County, Illinois